Cercle des Philadelphes was an academic scientific society in Saint-Domingue. It was founded in 1784 and ceased to function in 1791. It has been counted as the most prominent academic society in the Americas prior to the French Revolution.

One of its founding members was Médéric Louis Élie Moreau de Saint-Méry.

References
 James E. McClellan III: Colonialism and Science: Saint Domingue and the Old Regime
 American Philosophical Society: Cercle des Philadelphes du Cap François Collection

1784 in Haiti
1784 establishments in the French colonial empire
1784 establishments in North America
Learned societies of France
1791 disestablishments in North America
18th century in Haiti